Luthando Mateza (born 8 February 1998) is a South African soccer player who plays as a midfielder for Steenberg United.

Career statistics

Notes

References

1998 births
Living people
South African soccer players
Association football midfielders
South African Premier Division players
Cape Town Spurs F.C. players
Steenberg United F.C. players